Wigwam is an unincorporated community located in El Paso County, Colorado. It is located south of Fountain near the border of El Paso County, and is situated at an elevation of 5,223 feet. The town has a ZIP Code of 81008.

References

Unincorporated communities in El Paso County, Colorado
Unincorporated communities in Colorado